The Province of Las Palmas is a province of Spain, consisting of the eastern part of the autonomous community of the Canary Islands. Las Palmas de Gran Canaria, capital city of this province and of the island of Gran Canaria, is the largest city in the Canary Islands.

In 1927, the Province of Canary Islands was split into two provinces: Las Palmas and Santa Cruz de Tenerife. In 1982, both provinces became part of the newly founded autonomous community of the Canary Islands.

Geography

Composition

It consists of about half of the Atlantic archipelago, including the islands of Gran Canaria, Fuerteventura, and Lanzarote, as well as another six minor isles (Alegranza, Graciosa, Montaña Clara, Lobos, Roque del Este, and Roque del Oeste). Their total land area is 4,065.78 km2 (1,569.8 sq mi), representing 54.6% of the Canary Islands' total land. (The other half of the archipelago is the Province of Santa Cruz.)

General view
Its capital is the city of Las Palmas de Gran Canaria, on the island of Gran Canaria, which is also one of the capitals of the autonomous community (next to Santa Cruz de Tenerife). About 38.5% of the provincial population of 1,109,175 (2018) live in the capital. The name "Las Palmas" is generally used to refer to both the city and the province. There are 34 municipalities in the province; see List of municipalities in Las Palmas.

Las Palmas contains the Parque Nacional Timanfaya on the island of Lanzarote.

License plates in the province used to start with "GC", which referred to the island of Gran Canaria, although the same plates were also issued in Lanzarote and Fuerteventura.

Population
The historical population is given in the following chart:

Notes and references

External links

 Government of the Canary Islands

 
States and territories established in 1927
1927 establishments in Spain